Live in Japan is a live double album by English jazz-funk band Shakatak. It was recorded at the Nakano Sun Plaza Hall during the 1983 Japan tour, and originally released only in that country.

Track listing and format
 LP: Polydor  38MM 0344/5
 Double gatefold album with lyric insert.

Side One
"Introduction" (William "Bill" Sharpe) – 2.21*
"Dark Is The Night" (Sharpe, Roger Odell) – 4.09*
"Don't Say That Again" (Keith Winter) – 4:37
"Street Walkin'" (Sharpe, Odell) – 5.43*

Side Two
"Sanur" (Sharpe) – 5:11
"Slip Away" (Sharpe, Odell) – 4:57
"Invitations" (Sharpe, Odell) – 6.34
"Out of This World" (Sharpe, Odell) – 8:13 

Side Three
"Piano Solo" (Sharpe, Odell) – 7:11
"Bass Solo" (George Anderson) – 5.03
"On Nights Like Tonight" (Sharpe, Odell) – 5:09 
"Let's Get Together" (Sharpe, Odell) – 4.36*

Side Four
"Bitch to the Boys" (Sharpe, Odell) – 5.12
"Easier Said Than Done" (Sharpe, Odell) – 5.16*
"Night Birds" (Sharpe, Odell) – 7.16*

 Tracks marked with * were also included in the Shakatak Live! CD, released in 1985.
 Recorded 15 December 1983 Nakano Sun Plaza Hall, Nakano, Tokyo, Japan
 Mixed at Rock City Studios, Shepperton, England

Personnel
Shakatak
 Bill Sharpe – keyboards
 Keith Winter – guitar
 George Anderson – bass
 Roger Odell – drums
 Jill Saward – vocals, percussion
 Norma Lewis – vocals

Guest musician
 Ginji Sawai – saxophone

Production
 Produced by Nigel Wright
 Executive producer: Les McCutcheon
 Engineer: Nick Smith

References

External links 
 Shakatak - Live in Japan (1984) album credits & releases at AllMusic
 Shakatak - Live in Japan (1984) album releases & credits at Discogs
 Shakatak - Live in Japan (1984) album to be listened as stream on Spotify

Shakatak albums
1984 live albums
Albums produced by Nigel Wright